This is a list of Wikipedia articles about brand names under which acoustic guitars have been sold.

A-F

 Alvarez
 Aria
 Breedlove
 Cort
 D'Angelico
 Dean
 Dobro
 Eko
 Epiphone
 ESP
 Fender
 First Act
 Framus
 Furch

G-L

 Gibson
 Godin
 Greco
 Gretsch
 Guild
 Hagström
 Hallmark
 Höfner
 Ibanez
 Kay
 Lâg
 Larrivée
 Luna Guitars

M-R

 Martin
 Maton
 Michael Kelly
 Norman
 Oscar Schmidt by Washburn
 Ovation
 PRS Guitars
 Recording King
 Rickenbacker

S-Z

 Samick
 Schecter
 Seagull
 Sigma Guitars
 Silvertone
 Stagg
 Tagima
 Takamine Guitars
 Tokai
 Washburn
 Yamaha

Guitar